Claude Wilson (March 4, 1893 – May 16, 1976) was a Canadian professional ice hockey goaltender, spending majority of his career as the backup goaltender for the Toronto Blueshirts. Wilson was from Oshawa, Ontario.

Career 
In the 1914 NHA season, Wilson played three games in injury relief for regular goaltender Hap Holmes, including the first game of the Stanley Cup finals against the Victoria Aristocrats of the Pacific Coast Hockey Association. Wilson was included in the 1914 team picture with rest of the Stanley Cup championship team, however he was subsequently released from the Blueshirts the following season. He later returned; signing a contract to play with the Blueshirts on October 26, 1914; and played for three games in the 1915–16 season as the backup netminder to Percy LeSueur.

In late December 1916, Wilson, still under contract with the Blueshirts, was suspended by Toronto owner Eddie Livingstone when he "mysteriously disappeared" before a game against the Montreal Canadiens, until he relayed to the club he was in his hometown of Oshawa. His absence caused Billy Nicholson, the backup to play in the first two games. For this incident, Wilson was subsequently fined $100 and ordered back to Toronto by the hockey club.

Career statistics

References

1893 births
1976 deaths
Stanley Cup champions
Toronto Blueshirts players
Canadian ice hockey goaltenders